Pleasant Valley Historic District may refer to:

Pleasant Valley Historic District (Crandall, Georgia), listed on the National Register of Historic Places in Murray County, Georgia
Pleasant Valley Historic District (Mercer County, New Jersey), listed on the National Register of Historic Places in Hunterdon County and in Mercer County, New Jersey
Pleasant Valley Historic District (Warren County, New Jersey), listed on the National Register of Historic Places in Warren County, New Jersey